Thonakal Gopi aka Thanackal Gopi (born 24 May 1988) is an Indian athlete who has qualified to represent India at the 2016 Summer Olympics in the marathon event. He is also in the Indian Army. He is the first and so far the only Indian athlete to win gold medal in Asian Marathon Championship.

Career 
At age 21, he  joined as a general recruit, starting as a Hawildar at the Army Artillery Center in Hyderabad and completed the 9 month mandatory Army training.

Typically a 10,000m athlete, he was designated to keep Nitendra Rawat on track for the first 30 km so that Rawat may qualify for the Olympics with a timing of 02:15 at the 2016 Mumbai marathon. However, Gopi found the distance comfortable and kept going to complete as the 2nd Indian (11th overall, right behind Rawat). He says he never felt the anticipated fatigue of the last 5 km, even though he was bracing his body for it. His VO2 Max is around 84 (ml of Oxygen used in 1 min per kg of bodyweight, comparable to Lance Armstrong), with a resting heart rate of around 45bpm.

In addition to winning the 2014 Gold Medal in the 10,000 meter National Open Athletics and the 2016 Gold Medal in the South Asian Games with a new Games Record, Gopi represented India in the 2016 Asian Cross Country Championships. He represented India at the 2016 Summer Olympics, qualifying with a Marathon time of 02:16:15 in the 2016 Mumbai Marathon along with two other Indian marathoner men, Kheta Ram and Nitendra Singh Rawat.

Competition Record

Personal life 
Born in Wayanad district of the state of Kerala. The son of Wayanad farmers, Gopi is an only child who helped his parents grow rice and ginger while he grew up on their small area of land. Gopi went to Kakkavayal Govt. Higher Secondary School and used to consistently participate in school and college meets. He began a bachelor's degree in Economics at Mar Athanasius College in Kothamangalam, Kerala, but dropped out in the third year when he passed the Army fitness test and joined the Indian Army at Age 21. His home state of Kerala still produces the maximum number of track athletes in India.

He is the only earning member of his family and sends his savings home, except for a monthly purchase shoes (priced at roughly Rs 10,000 per pair) to accommodate the number of miles that the athlete runs each month. As of mid 2016, he does not have any corporate sponsorship and has to purchase his own shoes. He and his fellow athletes spend 11 out of 12 months of the year away from home and without meeting their families, a sacrifice that they must make in order to compete on the world stage.

References

Living people
1988 births
Place of birth missing (living people)
Indian male marathon runners
Indian male long-distance runners
Olympic athletes of India
Athletes (track and field) at the 2016 Summer Olympics
South Asian Games gold medalists for India
South Asian Games medalists in athletics